Kliegl is a German surname. It may refer to:
Johann Kliegl (1869–1959), German-American businessman
Anton Kliegl (1872–1927), German-American businessman and inventor, brother of Johann Kliegl
Kliegl Brothers Universal Electric Stage Lighting Company, Johann and Anton Kliegl's company
Klieg light, carbon arc light invented by Anton Kliegl

German-language surnames